Sagarika  was  an Indian Bengali television soap opera that premiered on 3 February 2019 and airs on Sun Bangla every day. The show was produced by Acropoliis Entertainment Pvt. Ltd. It stars Ritika Seth
and Kritish Chaakaraborty
in lead roles and Uponita Bnaerjee, Shreyasree Samanta, and Arindam Banerjee  in prominent supporting roles. The show went off air on 25 August 2019 due to constantantly low trp ratings.

Plot
Sagarika is a sport based, new age progressive story of a woman, inspired by swimming legends of Bengal who dared to dream and achieve. The story begins with Rai, a village girl from a very modest background, who has a big dream of conquering the world of swimming and crossing the seven seas. In her pursuits, she faces various hurdles from the society, family, rivals and from her in-laws.

Cast

Main cast
Ritika Seth
as Rai Mondal- A village girl who can multi-task and loves her family the most. Sagarika or Rai as she is fondly called, is a carefree and focused swimmer who wants to win laurels in swimming, and make her parents proud. Despite her poor financial condition and a challenging health issue, she makes her journey from her village to the city. She eventually marries Sanjay and continues her journey towards fulfilling her dreams against all odds. Ritika is a fit actress and is the perfect choice for the character.
Kritish Chaakaraborty as Sanjay Laha

References

Bengali-language television programming in India
Sun Bangla original programming